Candeğer Kılınçer Oğuz, née Kılınçer, (born 16 July 1980) is a Turkish female high jumper.

She studied at Dokuz Eylül University. Her coach is Tayfun Aygün, who contributed to the establishment of a special school for high jump in 2005.

In 2002, she transferred from Beşiktaş J.K. Athletics Team to Fenerbahçe Athletics, before she finally entered Enkaspor. Candeğer Kılınçer Oğuz broke the national record in 2004 with 1.93 m.

She studied labor economics and industrial relations at the Dokuz Eylül University in Izmir. She is married to her former coach, Turkish-Cypriot sprinter Reşat Oğuz.

Achievements

References

External links

1980 births
Living people
Turkish female high jumpers
Enkaspor athletes
Athletes (track and field) at the 2004 Summer Olympics
Olympic athletes of Turkey
Dokuz Eylül University alumni
Place of birth missing (living people)
Fenerbahçe athletes
Beşiktaş J.K. athletes
Competitors at the 2001 Summer Universiade
Competitors at the 2003 Summer Universiade
Competitors at the 2005 Summer Universiade
Athletes (track and field) at the 2001 Mediterranean Games
Athletes (track and field) at the 2005 Mediterranean Games
Mediterranean Games competitors for Turkey